The discography of BINI consists of one album, one EP's, seven singles, and two soundtrack albums. In November 20, 2020, the group's pre-debut single "Da Coconut Nut" which was adapted from the classic Filipino novelty song of the same namewas released. In June 11, 2021, BINI officially debuted, with their debut single "Born to Win".

Discography

Studio albums

Extended plays

Singles

Soundtracks

Concerts

Headlining concerts 

 BINI: The Launch - THE RUNWAY and THE SHOWCASE

Showcases

Joint tours and concerts

Concert participation 

 "#TikTokTogetherPH": A Virtual Fundraising Concert
 KTNX ANG BABAIT NINYO: THE KTX FUNDRAISING CHRISTMAS SPECIAL — P-Pop Rise
 POSITIVE VIBES FOR THE POSITIVE+: Benefit Concert for NICKL Entertainment

Filmography

Films

Shows

Music videos

Featured videos

Dance rehearsal videos

Television shows

Web shows

External links 

 
 BINI's account on Twitter

References 

  

Filipino pop music groups
Filipino girl groups
Musical groups established in 2020
Musical groups from Metro Manila
Star Magic
2020 establishments in the Philippines
Pop music group discographies